The A3 motorway  (Autovía EX-A3) is a road in Extremadura connecting Zafra and Jerez de los Caballeros.

References

Autopistas and autovías in Spain